Leveson-Gower, also Sutherland-Leveson-Gower, is the name of a powerful British noble family. Over time, several members of the Leveson-Gower family were made knights, baronets and peers. Hereditary titles held by the family include the dukedom of Sutherland, as well as the
ancient earldom of Sutherland (created c. 1230) and the earldom of Granville (created 1833). Several other members of the family have also risen to prominence.

Name
Leveson-Gower is a well-known example of an English surname with counterintuitive pronunciation.

The name Leveson is a patronymic from Louis or Lewis. In early modern times it was often rendered Luson: for example, in 1588, Elizabeth I received a letter from the King of Denmark concerning the depredations of Walter Leveson of Lilleshall Abbey, in which he is consistently referred to as Sir Walter Luson.

Gower is a locational name, possibly derived from a place so-named in Kent, or from the Gower Peninsula in southern Wales. It could also refer to one of the various towns named Gouy in northern France.

The hyphen is used by only some members of the family.

Titles in the family
Gower baronetcy, of Sittenham (created 1620, now a subsidiary title of the dukedom of Sutherland)
Baron Gower (created 1703, now a subsidiary title of the dukedom of Sutherland)
Viscount Trentham (created 1746, now a subsidiary title of the dukedom of Sutherland)
Earl Gower (created 1746, now a subsidiary title of the dukedom of Sutherland)
Earl Granville (created 1833)
Earl of Sutherland (created c. 1230)
Marquess of Stafford (created 1786, now a subsidiary title of the dukedom of Sutherland)
Duke of Sutherland (created 1833, passed to the Egerton family in 1963 along with the dukedom's subsidiary titles)

Other notable members
(All British)
Frederick Neville Sutherland Leveson-Gower (1874–1959), politician
H. D. G. Leveson Gower (1873–1954), English cricketer
Frederick Leveson-Gower (1871–1946), English cricketer
George Leveson-Gower (1858–1951), politician
Lord Ronald Sutherland-Leveson-Gower (1845–1916), politician
Granville Leveson-Gower, 1st Earl Granville (1773–1846) Whig statesman and diplomat
Granville Leveson-Gower, 2nd Earl Granville (1815–1891) Liberal politician and foreign minister
Granville Leveson-Gower, 3rd Earl Granville
John Leveson-Gower (1740–1792) Rear Admiral (Royal Navy) and politician

References

 
Noble families in the British Isles

de:Leveson-Gower
ru:Левесон-Гоуэр